Nakin Wisetchat (born 9 July 1999) is a Thai professional footballer who plays as a right back.

Career

Army United
He was loaned from Bangkok United to Army United in 2019, where he was voted the best player of the season by fans after 2 goals and 5 assists in 31 matches.

Ayutthaha United
He remains with Bangkok united but has been loaned to Thai League 2 club Ayutthaya United.

International career
He was called up for the 2018 AFC U-19 Championship qualification in November 2017. In March 2019, he was called up to play in the 2020 AFC U-23 Championship qualification. This was followed by being called up to the January 2020 AFC U-23 Championship (the AFC qualifiers for the 2020 Olympics).

Honour

Club
BG Pathum United
 Thailand Champions Cup (1): 2022

International
Thailand U-19
 2017 AFF U-19 Youth Championship: Champion

Thailand U-23
 2021 Southeast Asian Games:  Silver medal

References

External links
 

1999 births
Living people
Nakin Wisetchat
Nakin Wisetchat
Nakin Wisetchat
Association football defenders
Nakin Wisetchat
Nakin Wisetchat
Nakin Wisetchat
Competitors at the 2021 Southeast Asian Games
Nakin Wisetchat